Dibromine trioxide is the chemical compound composed of bromine and oxygen with the formula Br2O3. It is an orange solid that is stable below −40 °C. It has the structure Br−O−BrO2 (bromine bromate).
The Br−O−Br bond is bent, with a bond angle of 111.2°, and the Br−O−BrO2 bond length is 1.85Å.

Reactions
Dibromine trioxide can be prepared by reacting a solution of bromine in dichloromethane with ozone at low temperatures. 
It disproportionates in alkali solutions to Br and BrO.

References

Bromine(V) compounds
Sesquioxides
Bromine(I) compounds
Mixed valence compounds